Roger Federer defeated Ivan Ljubičić 6–3, 6–1 to win the 2005 Qatar Open singles competition. He did not lose a single set in the entire tournament. 

Nicolas Escudé was the defending champion but did not defend his title.

Seeds

  Roger Federer (champion)
  Gastón Gaudio (first round)
  Sébastien Grosjean (quarterfinals)
  Mikhail Youzhny (first round)
  Andrei Pavel (first round)
  Ivan Ljubičić (final)
  Feliciano López (quarterfinals)
  Nikolay Davydenko (semifinals)

Draws

Finals

Section 1

Section 2

External links
2005 Qatar Open Main draw
2005 Qatar Open Qualifying draw

2005 Qatar Open
Qatar Open (tennis)
2005 ATP Tour